is a Japanese restaurant chain that specialises in crustaceans and other seafood.

The restaurants are known for their traditional appearance and the large animatronic red crab above their main entrances.

References

External links 

 

Restaurants established in 1971
Japanese companies established in 1971
Restaurant chains in Japan
Seafood restaurants